Auguste Jouhaud (6 October 1805, Brussels – 27 January 1888, Paris) was a 19th-century Belgian writer and playwright who authored more than 600 theatre plays.

Main plays 
 Un voyage à melun (1842)
 La fauvette : opéra-comique
 Les Hussards de la République
 La folle de Waterloo
 Un mari en location
 L'Amour au village : opérette
 Mes petits mémoires
 Les deux Pierrots
 Catherine 3/6, three-act comédie en vaudeville, parody of La Reine Margot by Alexandre Dumas, with Adolphe Salvat

External links 
 Auguste Jouhaud on data.bnf.fr

19th-century Belgian writers
19th-century Belgian dramatists and playwrights
19th-century Belgian male writers
Belgian male dramatists and playwrights
1805 births
Writers from Brussels
1888 deaths